Delaware River Bridge or Delaware River Bridges may refer to:

 Benjamin Franklin Bridge - originally named the Delaware River Bridge
 Delaware River – Turnpike Toll Bridge - sometimes referred to as the Delaware River Bridge
 Delaware Memorial Bridge - sometimes referred to as the Delaware River Bridges
 Darlington's Bridge at Delaware Station - was referred to as the Delaware River Bridge by locals before demolition
 List of crossings of the Delaware River - a list of all bridges across the Delaware River